William "Willy" Freitag is a former U.S. soccer defender.  Freitag earned three caps with the U.S. national team in 1960 and 1961.  His first two games came in World Cup qualifiers in November 1960.  The first game was a 3-3 tie and the second was a 3-0 loss, both to Mexico.  His third, and final, game was a 2-0 loss to Colombia on February 5, 1961.

References

American soccer players
United States men's international soccer players
Living people
Association football defenders
Year of birth missing (living people)